Carbonara di Po is a comune (municipality) in the Province of Mantua in the Italian region Lombardy, located about  east of Milan and about  southeast of Mantua.

Carbonara di Po borders the following municipalities: Bergantino, Borgofranco sul Po, Castelnovo Bariano, Magnacavallo, Sermide e Felonica.

References

Cities and towns in Lombardy